Rao Bahadur T. Rattinasami Nadar was the founder of Nadar Mahajana Sangam. He founded the organisation with a number of leaders from Nadar community under the presidency of his uncle in 1910. The Sangam was founded to extend demands for membership in the Madras Legislative Council. Rettinasami Nadar died one year after the founding of the Sangam.

References 

Indian caste leaders
Rai Bahadurs